Hoot Gibson (1892–1962) was an American rodeo performer, actor, and film director.

Other persons with this nickname include:

 Bob Gibson (1935–2020), Major League Baseball pitcher
 Claude "Hoot" Gibson (born 1939), American football player and coach
 Harvey "Hoot" Gibson (1934–2015), pilot of TWA Flight 841 (1979), a Boeing 727 involved in an in-flight incident in 1979
 Ralph Gibson (fighter pilot) (1924–2009), fighter pilot
 Robert L. Gibson (born 1946), NASA astronaut
 Ward Gibson (1921–1958), American professional basketball player
 Weldon B. Gibson (born 1917), Economics researcher at SRI International
 Robert Gibson (wrestler) (born 1958), American professional wrestler

Gibson, Hoot